Les Misérables is a seven-part radio series broadcast July 23 – September 3, 1937 (Fridays at 10 p.m. ET), on the Mutual Network. Orson Welles adapted Victor Hugo's 1862 novel, directed the series, and starred as Jean Valjean. The 22-year-old Welles developed the idea of telling stories with first-person narration on the series, which was his first job as a writer-director for radio.

Marking the radio debut of the Mercury Theatre, Welles's Les Misérables was described by biographer Simon Callow as "one of his earliest, finest and most serious achievements on radio". The production costarred Martin Gabel as Javert, Alice Frost as Fantine, and Virginia Nicolson, Welles's first wife, as the adult Cosette. The supporting cast included Ray Collins, Agnes Moorehead, Everett Sloane, Betty Garde, Hiram Sherman, Frank Readick, Richard Widmark, Richard Wilson and William Alland.

Episodes

See also
 Adaptations of Les Misérables

References

External links
 Les Misérables at the Internet Archive

1930s American radio programs
1937 radio programme debuts
1937 radio programme endings
American radio dramas
Les Misérables
Works based on Les Misérables
Mutual Broadcasting System programs